Timur Aylyarov (born February 2, 1989) is a Russian kickboxer. He is the 2016 K-1 85 kg World Grand Prix Winner.

Kickboxing career
Timur took part in the 2015 Tatneft Cup 80kg Tournament. He defeated Giuseppe De Domenico in the 1/8 of the tournament by a second round TKO. He beat Sergej Braun in the quarterfinals and Pavel Turuk in the semifinals by unanimous decision. The fight with Alexander Dimitrenko in the finals went into an extra fourth round, after which Aylyarov won a decision.

Aylyarov participated in the 2016 85kg K-1 World Grand Prix. He knocked out Vasil Ducár in the quarter finals. In the semifinals, Timur met Agron Preteni, whom he defeated by unanimous decision. In the finals, he fought Igor Emkić, and won the tournament through a second round TKO.

Returning after a two year absence from the sport, Aylyarov fought Artur Kyshenko during KLF 74. He lost the fight by a third round TKO.

Titles
 2015 Tatneft Cup -80kg Champion
 2016 WKF World Middleweight Champion
 2016 K-1 World GP 2016 -85kg World Tournament Winner

Fight record 

|-  style="background:#fbb;"
| 2018-05-13|| Loss ||align=left| Artur Kyshenko || Kunlun Fight 74 || China || TKO (Punches) || 3 || 2:40
|-  style="background:#cfc;"
| 2016-12-03 || Win ||align=left| Igor Emkić || K-1 World GP 2016: -85kg World Tournament Final  || Tuzla, Bosnia and Herzegovina || TKO (Punches)  || 2 ||   
|-
! style=background:white colspan=9 |
|-  style="background:#cfc;"
| 2016-12-03 || Win ||align=left| Agron Preteni || K-1 World GP 2016: -85kg World Tournament Semi Finals  || Tuzla, Bosnia and Herzegovina || Decision (Unanimous)  || 3 || 3:00
|-  style="background:#cfc;"
| 2016-12-03 || Win ||align=left| Vasil Ducár || K-1 World GP 2016: -85kg World Tournament Quarter Finals  || Tuzla, Bosnia and Herzegovina || KO  ||  ||
|-  style="background:#cfc;"
| 2016-09-16 || Win ||align=left| Jiri Kopechny  || Strong Russia || Russia || TKO (Punches) || 2 || 1:12   
|-
! style=background:white colspan=9 |
|-  style="background:#fbb;"
| 2016-05-19 || Loss ||align=left| Nadir Iskhakov || Grand Prix Russia Open 20 || Russia || Decision (Unanimous) || 5 || 3:00   
|-
! style=background:white colspan=9 |
|-  style="background:#cfc;"
| 2016-02-27 || Win ||align=left| Darryl Sichtman || ACB KB 5: Let's Knock The Winter Out || Orel, Russia || Decision ||  3|| 3:00
|-  style="background:#cfc;"
| 2015-06-18 || Win ||align=left| Evegeniy Vorontsov || Grand Prix Russia Open 17  || Russia || Decision (Unanimous) || 3 || 3:00
|-  style="background:#cfc;"
| 2015-09-04 || Win ||align=left| Aleksandr Dmitrenko || Tatneft Cup, -80kg Tournament Final  || Kazan, Russia || Ext.R Decision || 4 || 3:00  
|-
! style=background:white colspan=9 |
|-  style="background:#cfc;"
| 2015-08-04 || Win ||align=left| Pavel Turuk || Tatneft Cup, -80kg Tournament Semi Final  || Kazan, Russia || Decision (Unanimous) || 3 || 3:00
|-  style="background:#cfc;"
| 2015-04-29 || Win ||align=left| Sergej Braun || Tatneft Cup, -80kg Tournament Quarter Final  || Kazan, Russia || Decision (Unanimous) || 3 || 3:00
|-  style="background:#cfc;"
| 2015-01-24 || Win ||align=left| Giuseppe De Domenico || Tatneft Cup, -80kg Tournament 1/8 Final  || Kazan, Russia || TKO (Punches) || 2 ||
|-  style="background:#cfc;"
| 2014- || Win ||align=left|  Artur Gaydarbekov||  || Russia || TKO (High Kick) || 2 ||
|-  style="background:#cfc;"
| 2014-03-28 || Win ||align=left| Alexander Mischenko|| EFN: Battle of Moscow 15 || Moscow, Russia || KO  ||  ||
|-  style="background:#fbb;"
| 2007-11-30 || Loss ||align=left| Sergey Mostaikin || Tatneft Cup || Kazan, Russia || Decision (Unanimous) || 3 || 3:00  
|-
|-
| colspan=9 | Legend:

See also 
List of male kickboxers

References

1989 births
Living people
Russian male kickboxers
Sportspeople from Vladikavkaz
Middleweight kickboxers